Strine is a humorous word for a type of Australian accent.

Strine may also refer to:

Strines, a village in Greater Manchester
Strine Brook, a tributary of River Douglas in Lancashire, England
River Strine, Shropshire, England
Charles Strine (1867–1907), American theatrical and opera manager
Leo E. Strine, Jr. (born 1964), American judge
Michael Strine, former vice president of the Federal Reserve Bank of New York

See also
Strinesdale Reservoir, in Greater Manchester, England